Xanthomelaena is a genus of moths of the family Crambidae. It contains only one species, Xanthomelaena schematias, which is found on Borneo.

References

Natural History Museum Lepidoptera genus database

Pyraustinae
Taxa named by George Hampson
Monotypic moth genera
Moths of Asia
Crambidae genera